Kiyohara no Fukayabu (清原 深養父, fl.9th/10th Century) was a Japanese poet of Heian period (9-10th century). He is an author of the thirty-sixth poem of the Ogura Hyakunin Isshu and contributor of 17 poems to the Kokin Wakashū. 

He is the  grandfather of Kiyohara no Motosuke, author of poem 42, and  the great-grandfather  of Sei Shonagon, author of poem 62 of the Ogura Hyakunin Isshu.

See also

 Hyakunin Isshu poem 36
 Kokin Wakashū
 Kiyohara
 Kiyohara no Motosuke

References 

Japanese poets
Hyakunin Isshu poets